Virgile Lacombe (born 7 July 1984 in Brou-sur-Chantereine, France) was a French rugby union footballer who usually played in the hooker position.
He became a coach with Stade Toulousain after retiring.

Career
He started his career at Nîmes, but moved to Toulouse for the 1999–2000 French Rugby Union Championship. During seven seasons at Toulouse, he made 131 appearances and won the Top 14 championship in 2007–08 and 2010–11, as well as the Heineken Cup in 2004–05 and the 2009–10.

He then joined CA Brive for the 2011–12 Top 14 season, but returned to Toulouse the following season as a medical joker.

2013 Southern Kings Super Rugby season

Return to France
He signed a deal to return to France to play for Racing Métro for 2013–14 and left the Kings in July 2013.
His last club as a player will be Lyon OU which he joined in 2017, before retiring in 2019 to accept a role as scrum coach for his beloved club, Stade Toulousain.

Honours
 Top 14 – 2007–08 and 2010–11 with Toulouse
 Heineken Cup – 2004–05 and 2009–10 with Toulouse

References

1984 births
Living people
French rugby union players
Stade Toulousain players
CA Brive players
Eastern Province Elephants players
Southern Kings players
French expatriate rugby union players
Expatriate rugby union players in South Africa
French expatriate sportspeople in South Africa
Rugby union hookers